Grzegorz Sposób (born 12 February 1976 in Świdnik) is a Polish high jumper.  He finished sixth at the 2003 World Championships in Paris with a jump of 2.29 metres. The next year he competed in the 2004 Olympics, but failed to qualify from his pool.

His personal best jump is 2.34 metres, achieved in June 2004 in Bydgoszcz.

Competition record

External links

1976 births
Living people
Polish male high jumpers
Athletes (track and field) at the 2004 Summer Olympics
Olympic athletes of Poland
People from Świdnik
Sportspeople from Lublin Voivodeship